İbrişim is a village in Tarsus district of Mersin Province, Turkey. At  it is situated on the lower slopes of the Toros Mountains . The population of İbrişim is  567  as of 2011. The main economic sector of the village is viticulture. Olives and various fruits are also produced.

References

Villages in Tarsus District